Eduardo Nascimento da Silva Júnior (born 5 March 1993), commonly known as Edu, is a Brazilian footballer who plays as a forward for Emirati club Dibba Al Fujairah, on loan from Cruzeiro.

Club career

On 7 October 2014, after being São Gonçalo's top goalscorer in the year's Campeonato Carioca Série C, Edu signed for Boavista. He returned to SGFC after playing rarely in the 2015 Campeonato Carioca, and scored a further seven times for the club before joining Itaboraí on 10 July 2015.

On 21 September 2017, after scoring prolifically for Itaboraí, Edu agreed to a pre-contract deal with Brusque for the Copa Santa Catarina. The following 28 March, after featuring sparingly, he returned to his previous club.

On 18 October 2018, Edu signed for Nova Iguaçu, but moved out on loan to Atlético Tubarão on 22 February of the following year. On 29 December 2019, he returned to Brusque after signing a deal until April 2021.

In August 2020, after becoming an undisputed starter, Edu suffered a knee injury, and was sidelined for the remainder of the campaign, which ended in promotion to the Série B. On 17 April 2021, he renewed his contract until November 2022.

On 15 October 2021, during a match against Remo, Edu missed a penalty, scored one goal and subsequently played as a goalkeeper after Ruan Carneiro was taken off due to an injury; he also saved a penalty late in the match. He finished the league as top scorer with 17 goals, as his side narrowly avoided relegation.

On 9 December 2021, Edu joined fellow second division side Cruzeiro. After being a starter during the season as the club achieved promotion to the Série A, he was loaned to Emirati club Dibba Al Fujairah until June.

Career statistics

Honours
Brusque
 Recopa Catarinense: 2020
Cruzeiro 
 Campeonato Brasileiro - Série B: 2022

References

External links

1993 births
Living people
Footballers from Rio de Janeiro (city)
Brazilian footballers
Association football forwards
Campeonato Brasileiro Série B players
Campeonato Brasileiro Série C players
Campeonato Brasileiro Série D players
Boavista Sport Club players
Associação Desportiva Itaboraí players
Associação Atlética Portuguesa (RJ) players
Brusque Futebol Clube players
Nova Iguaçu Futebol Clube players
Clube Atlético Tubarão players
Cruzeiro Esporte Clube players
Dibba FC players
Outfield association footballers who played in goal
Brazilian expatriate footballers
Brazilian expatriate sportspeople in the United Arab Emirates
Expatriate footballers in the United Arab Emirates